25 Years in Rock... and Still Going Strong is a boxed set of two DVDs and a CD by the German hard rock singer Doro Pesch, released in 2010 through Nuclear Blast Records.

The first DVD contains the full video of a concert held by Doro in Düsseldorf, Germany, on 13 December 2008, featuring many guests and friends and celebrating 25 years of the German singer's career. The second DVD features a long documentary with the making of the concert and bonus footage of other Doro's tours and shows.

Track listing

DVD 1
25 Years in Rock - The Concert 
"Intro 25 Years" - 4:50
"Earthshaker Rock" - 4:05
"I Rule the Ruins" - 5:49
"You're My Family" - 4:47
"The Night of the Warlock" - 6:41
"Hellraiser" - 5:32
"Always Live to Win" (feat. Bobby "Blitz" Ellsworth) - 4:02
"Above the Ashes" - 4:59
"She's Like Thunder" - 3:52
"Herzblut" - 5:01
"Für Immer" - 7:19
"Burn It Up" (feat. Jean Beauvoir) - 3:52
"Metal Tango" - 4:09
"Drum Solo by Johnny Dee" - 9:54
"Celebrate" (Full Metal Female Version) (feat. Sabina Classen, Floor Jansen, Liv Kristine, Ji-In Cho, Liv Jagrell, Jackie Chambers, Enid Williams) - 7:03
"Love Me in Black" - 6:39
"Walking with the Angels" (feat. Tarja Turunen) - 5:55
"East Meets West" (feat. Chris Boltendahl, Axel Rudi Pell) - 5:16
"Breaking the Law" - 4:40
"Big City Nights" (feat. Klaus Meine, Rudolf Schenker) - 6:15
"Rock You Like a Hurricane" (feat. Klaus Meine, Rudolf Schenker) - 6:31
"Fight for Rock" (Warlock line-up 1986) - 3:22
"Burning the Witches" (Warlock line-up 1986) - 7:15
"True as Steel" (Warlock line-up 1986, feat. Warrel Dane) - 5:24
"Unholy Love" (feat. Honza K.Behunek) - 4:41
"Fight" - 4:43
"All We Are" (feat. all the guests of this special night and a lot of good friends) - 9:42
"Outro" - 2:53

DVD 2
25 Years in Rock - The Documentary
Intro
From Concept to Creation
Soundcheck
Ready to Go

Making of the Warlock

Fans International

The Show Is Over
After the Show
Outro

Extra features, highlights & bonus goodies
2500th Concert Special (feat. extracts of "I Rule the Ruins", "Danke", "Burning the Witches" (with Andy Brings), "Burn Bitch Burn", "We Are the Metalheads" (with Schmier), "On My Own" (with Luke Gasser and Marc Storace), "You're My Family", "Unholy Love")
China Special
Wacken Open Air 2009
"I Rule the Ruins"
"Burning the Witches"
"Burn It Up"
Bang Your Head 2010
"Egypt (The Chains Are On)"
"Running with the Devil"
Summer Breeze 2007
"You're My Family" (feat. Chris Caffery)
Metal Female Voices Fest 2009
"True as Steel" 
"Hellbound" 
"We Are the Metalheads"
TV Special : 2500th Concert
A Tattoo from Doro at Germany Ink

Bonus CD
Special tracks from the 25th Anniversary Show
"Introduction" - 0:19
"Earthshaker Rock" - 4:06
"I Rule the Ruins" - 4:01
"You're My Family" - 4:28
"Herzblut" - 4:33
"Unholy Love" (feat. Honza Behunek) - 4:12
"East Meets West" (feat. Chris Boltendahl) - 4:17
"Burn It Up" (feat. Jean Beauvoir) - 3:07
"Above the Ashes" - 4:16
"Celebrate" (feat. Sabina Classen, Floor Jansen, Ji-In Cho, Liv Kristine, Liv Jagrell, Jackie Chambers, Enid Williams) - 4:52
"Breaking the Law" - 4:40

Personnel

Band members
Doro Pesch - vocals
Joe Taylor - guitars, backing vocals
Oliver Palotai - keyboards, guitars, backing vocals
Nick Douglas - bass, keyboards, backing vocals
Johnny Dee - drums, backing vocals

Warlock 1986 members
Doro Pesch - vocals
Peter Szigeti - guitars
Niko Arvanitis - guitars
Nick Douglas - bass, backing vocals
Michael Eurich - drums

References

External links
Official Doro website

Doro (musician) video albums
Doro (musician) live albums
2010 video albums
2010 live albums
Nuclear Blast video albums
Nuclear Blast live albums
Live video albums